Paul Gregori is a paralympic athlete from France competing mainly in category T42 sprint events.

Paul won silver in both the 100m and 200m in the T42 class in the 1996 Summer Paralympics held in Atlanta.

References

External links 
 

Paralympic athletes of France
Athletes (track and field) at the 1996 Summer Paralympics
Paralympic silver medalists for France
French male sprinters
Living people
Medalists at the 1996 Summer Paralympics
Year of birth missing (living people)
Paralympic medalists in athletics (track and field)
Sprinters with limb difference
Paralympic sprinters